Venda Football Academy is a South African football club based in Venda, South Africa. After previously playing in the SAFA Second Division, they moved to the National First Division at the start of the 2021-22 season after businessman Robinson Ramaite purchased the franchise from Cape Umoya United.

Current squad

Seasons 
 2019–20 SAFA Second Division, Limpopo Stream - 6th
 2020–21 SAFA Second Division, Limpopo Stream A - 5th

References 

Association football clubs established in 2021
2021 establishments in South Africa
Soccer clubs in South Africa
National First Division clubs
Thohoyandou